Nic Fitisemanu is a retired New Zealand rugby union player of Samoan descent who played number 8 for Nottingham, Newport Gwent Dragons and Bourg-en-Bresse.

He is now coaching at his former club Marist St Pats in Wellington.

He is a relative of actor and former professional wrestler Dwayne Johnson.

References

External links
Newport profile

New Zealand rugby union coaches
New Zealand rugby union players
Dragons RFC players
Living people
1978 births
New Zealand expatriate rugby union players
Expatriate rugby union players in Australia
Expatriate rugby union players in France
Expatriate rugby union players in Wales
New Zealand expatriate sportspeople in Wales
New Zealand expatriate sportspeople in Australia
New Zealand expatriate sportspeople in France
New Zealand sportspeople of Samoan descent
Rugby union players from Wellington City